Kanegem is a Belgian locality, part of the municipality of Tielt, in the eastern part of the province of West Flanders. This rural locality is known as the "Green Village".

Sightseeing 
 St. Bavo's Church, a Baroque church, well known locally as De kathedraal van te lande ("the country cathedral")
 Mevrouw Windmill

Famous personalities 
 Godfried Danneels, Belgian cardinal and former archbishop of Mechelen
 August Vandekerkhove, inventor and author
 Briek Schotte, racing cyclist.

Populated places in West Flanders